Shigeru Nakamura may refer to:

, Japanese Renju player
Shigeru Nakamura (karate instructor) (1894–1969), Japanese karate instructor
Shigeru Nakamura (1911–2022), Japanese supercentenarian